United Opposition may refer to:

United Opposition (Greece)
United Opposition (Hungary, 1930s)
United Opposition (India, 2022)
United Opposition (Philippines)
United Opposition (Soviet Union)
United Opposition of Serbia

See also
Opposition (politics)
United for Hungary, previously known as United Opposition